McKittrick may refer to:

People

 Amanda Margaret Ross née McKittrick (1860–1939), known by her pen name Amanda McKittrick Ros, Northern Irish writer 
 Bobb McKittrick (1935–2000), American professional football player
 David McKittrick (b. 1949), Northern Irish journalist
 Ralph McKittrick (1877–1923), American golfer and tennis player
 Rob McKittrick (b. 1973), American filmmaker
 Jason McKittrick (b. 1974), American archer
Places

 McKittrick Canyon, a scenic canyon in Texas in the United States
 McKittrick Oil Field, an oil field in California in the United States
 McKittrick Hotel, site of the play Sleep No More
 McKittrick, California, a census-designated place in Kern County, California, in the United States
 McKittrick, Missouri, a city in Montgomery County, Missouri, in the United States

See also

 McKitrick, an alternative spelling
 McKitterick